"Our Last Summer" is a song by ABBA from the group's seventh studio album, Super Trouper.  It was written by Benny Andersson and Björn Ulvaeus.

Recording for this track began on 4 June 1980 in Polar Music Studios.  The song features Anni-Frid Lyngstad on lead vocals and her time in the studio during the recording is captured in a series of photographs taken by Anders Hanser.

In the background of the bridge to this song, during Lasse Wellander's guitar solo, part of the Chess song, "Anthem" can be heard.  Andersson and Ulvaeus had been working on the melody for Anthem for a number of years but had never found a place for it in any ABBA project.  When they finally came to use it in the musical Chess they hoped that no one would notice that part of it had already been used in Our Last Summer.

Ulvaeus found lyrical inspiration for this song in a memory of a romance he had during a visit to Paris as a teenager. The song is used in the ABBA songs-based musical Mamma Mia!. That version was certified Silver by BPI in 2022.

References 

ABBA songs
1980 songs
Rock ballads
Songs written by Benny Andersson and Björn Ulvaeus
Songs about Paris
1980s ballads
Songs about nostalgia